District 22 of the Texas Senate is a senatorial district that currently serves all of Bosque, Ellis, Falls, Hill, Hood, Johnson, McLennan, Navarro, Somervell counties and portions of Tarrant county in the U.S. state of Texas.

The current Senator from District 22 is Brian Birdwell.

Top 5 biggest cities in district
District 22 has a population of 809,840 with 592,255 that is at voting age from the 2010 census.

Election history
Election history of District 22 from 1992.

Previous elections

2020

2016

2012

2010

2006

2002

1998

1994

1992

District officeholders

Notes

References

22
Bosque County, Texas
Ellis County, Texas
Falls County, Texas
Hill County, Texas
Hood County, Texas
Johnson County, Texas
McLennan County, Texas
Navarro County, Texas
Somervell County, Texas
Tarrant County, Texas